Ancorinidae is a family of marine sponges belonging to the order of Tetractinellida.

Genera 

Ancorina Schmidt, 1862
Asteropus Sollas, 1888
Chelotropella Lendenfeld, 1907
Cryptosyringa Vacelet, 1979 
Dercitus Gray, 1867
Disyringa Sollas, 1888
Ecionemia Bowerbank, 1862
Holoxea Topsent, 1892
Jaspis Gray, 1867
Psammastra Sollas, 1886
Rhabdastrella Thiele, 1903
Stelletta Schmidt, 1862
Stellettinopsis Carter, 1879
Stryphnus Sollas, 1886
Tethyopsis Stewart, 1870
Tribrachium Weltner, 1882

References 

Tetractinellida
Taxa named by Eduard Oscar Schmidt